L'Illustration was a weekly French newspaper published in Paris from 1843 to 1944. It was founded by Édouard Charton with the first issue published on 4 March 1843, it became the first illustrated newspaper in France then, after 1906, the first international illustrated magazine; distributed in 150 countries.

History
In 1891, L'Illustration became the first French newspaper to publish a photograph. Many of these photographs came from syndicated photo-press agencies like Chusseau-Flaviens, but the publication also employed its own photographers such as Léon Gimpel and others. In 1907, L'Illustration was the first to publish a color photograph. It also published Gaston Leroux' novel Le mystère de la chambre jaune as a serial a year before its 1908 release. La Petite Illustration was the name of the supplement to L'Illustration that published fiction, plays, and other arts-related material.

During the Second World War, while it was owned by the Baschet family, L'Illustration supported Marshal Philippe Pétain's Révolution nationale, but turned down pro-German articles by Jacques Bouly de Lesdain. However, Lesdain later became its political editor.

The magazine was shut down in 1944 following the Liberation of Paris. Another version re-opened in 1945 under the name France-Illustration, but went bankrupt in 1957.

Notable contributors

Editor-in-chief
 Gaston Sorbets (from 1923).

Journalists
 Gustave Babin

Writers
 Brada

Notable photographers

 Joshua Benoliel
 Victor Bulla
 Blanquart-Evrard
 Brébisson  
 Disdéri 
 Jules Gervais-Courtellemont
 Léon Gimpel
 Jimmy Hare
 Gustave Le Gray  
 Mayer et Pierson

Notable illustrators (1843-1914)

 Andriolli
 Bertall
 Pharamond Blanchard
 Karl Bodmer
 Joseph-Félix Bouchor
 Alexandre Jean-Baptiste Brun
 Eugène Burnand
 Cami
 Caran d'Ache
 Cham
 Henry Cheffer
 Dagnan-Bouveret
 Draner
 Durand-Brager
 Jules Férat
 Forain
 Gustave Fraipont
 Gavarni
 Henry Gerbault
 Henri Gervex
 Victor Gilbert
 Jules Girardet
 Karl Girardet
 Grandville
 Eugène Grasset
 Albert Guillaume
 Dudley Hardy
 Charles Hoffbauer
 Janet-Lange
 Jeanniot
 Lucien Jonas
 Kupka
 Jules Laurens
 Charles Léandre
 Lorsay
 Louis Malteste
 Malo-Renault
 Alfons Mucha
 Louis Rémy Sabattier
 Georges Scott

Gallery

References

Sources

External links

 Official website of L'Illustration company which have published L'Illustration
 Hathi Trust. L'Illustration, digitized issues

1843 establishments in France
1944 disestablishments in France
Defunct newspapers published in France
Defunct weekly newspapers
Newspapers published in Paris
Publications established in 1843
Magazines disestablished in 1944
Newspapers of the Vichy regime
Weekly magazines published in France
Magazines established in 1906
Defunct magazines published in France